Nizhneutyashevo (Tübänge Ütäş) is a rural locality (a selo) and the administrative centre of Utyashevsky Selsoviet, Belokataysky District, Bashkortostan, Russia. The population was 420 as of 2010. There are 6 streets.

Geography 
Nizhneutyashevo is located 6 km south of Novobelokatay (the district's administrative centre) by road. Verkhneutyashevo is the nearest rural locality.

References 

Rural localities in Belokataysky District